Como Nord Lago is a railway station in Como, Italy. It is located in proximity of the lake and a 5-minute walk to the town center.

Train services are operated exclusively by Trenord between Como Nord Lago and Milano Cadorna.

The station is the terminus of the line from Milano Cadorna railway station.

See also

History of rail transport in Italy
Rail transport in Italy
Railway stations in Italy

References

External links

Como Nord Lago Railway Station
Railway stations in Lombardy
Railway stations opened in 1885
1885 establishments in Italy
Railway stations in Italy opened in the 19th century